KYOM-LP (104.9 FM) is a low-power broadcast radio station licensed to Wichita, Kansas. KYOM-LP received a construction permit on February 14, 2014.

The station's studios and transmitter are currently located just west of Wichita State University on 17th Street.

References

External links
 KYOM Website
 KYOM-LP Facebook Page
 

YOM-LP
Radio stations established in 2015
2015 establishments in Kansas
Urban contemporary radio stations in the United States